Mikhaylovka is a rural locality (a village) in Borisoglebskoye Rural Settlement, Muromsky District, Vladimir Oblast, Russia. The population was 11 as of 2010.

Geography 
Mikhaylovka is located 50 km northeast of Murom (the district's administrative centre) by road. Sosnitsy is the nearest rural locality.

References 

Rural localities in Muromsky District
Gorokhovetsky Uyezd